Switchfoot: Live – EP is a live EP from San Diego rock band Switchfoot. It was released on the online music services iTunes and Rhapsody and features songs recorded live at Soma in San Diego. Additionally, these songs, along with the rest of the setlist at the show, were released on the DVD, Live in San Diego.  An alternative version of this EP featuring the track "Ammunition" was available on iTunes for several months, although it was deleted shortly after the official version was added.

Track listing

External links
Switchfoot.com

2004 debut EPs
2004 live albums
Live EPs
Switchfoot EPs
Switchfoot live albums